Alfonso Calderón may refer to:

Alfonso Calderon (activist) (born 2001), American activist against gun violence
Alfonso Calderón (poet) (1930–2009), Chilean poet

See also 
Calderón